Hercules and the Nemean Lion is a sculpture of Hercules fighting the Nemean lion by Max Klein, installed in the Kolonnadenhof outside the Alte Nationalgalerie in Berlin, Germany.

References

External links

 

Sculptures of lions
Outdoor sculptures in Berlin
Sculptures of Heracles
Sculptures of men in Germany